Maria Maragkoudaki is a Greek artist from Chania, Crete interested in the realistic pictures.

Biography
Maria Maragkoudaki, was born in Chania on the island of Crete. She studied at the Athens School of Fine Arts,  with Dimitris Mytaras as her professor, and graduated in 1998. She received  master's degree in 2005 from the National and Kapodistrian University of Athens. She studied Byzantine painters of the 14th century in Western Crete. The title of the dissertation is "The murals of the church of Panagia Skafidianis (1347) in Prodromi Selino and the painter ioakeim".

Exhibitions

Personal exhibitions
2003 Gallery Ersi.

2009 Gallery Adam, Personal Affairs.

2010 Gallery Mylonogianni, City of Chania and others Portraits.

Group exhibitions
2003 Rethymnon Centre for Contemporary Art "Oikade"

2009 CHAMBER OF FINE ARTS  "The Human Form in Art"

2010 International Exhibition of art works "The ancient olive groves of Crete at a depth of time"

2010 Municipal Art Gallery of Chania "Art and Place, 52 Contemporary artists from Chania"

Research 
Athens School of Fine Arts Model of Ecology.

References

External links
Artist's own website

Greek painters
Living people
Year of birth missing (living people)
Greek women painters
21st-century Greek women artists
People from Chania